Singapore Synchrotron Light Source (SSLS) is a synchrotron radiation facility located on Kent Ridge campus of the National University of Singapore.

Footnotes

References

External links
 Official website

Synchrotron radiation facilities